John Fraser MacPherson CM (10 April 1928 – 27 September 1993) was a Canadian jazz musician from Saint Boniface, Manitoba.

MacPherson moved to Victoria, British Columbia, as a child. He learned piano, clarinet, and alto and tenor saxophones. After moving to Vancouver to continue a commerce degree, he played in bands led by Ray Norris, Dave Robbins, Paul Ruhland, and Doug Parke. He led his own groups and eventually took over the leadership of the Cave supper club band. He took a year's leave in 1958 to study in New York City, adding flute to his list of instruments. He played on the CBC and won a Juno Award for Best Jazz Album in 1983. He was awarded the Order of Canada in 1987.

Throughout the 1960s and 1970s MacPherson was a first-call studio player in Vancouver, as well as leading the house band at the Cave supper club. He also taught briefly in the Jazz and Commercial Music department at Vancouver Community College, where his students included future Powder Blues Band baritone saxophonist Gordie Bertram and New Orleans based saxophonist and jazz educator John Doheny. Live at the Planetarium, MacPherson's first album as leader of a small jazz group, was recorded for broadcast on the French-language CBC radio network. He leased the master tapes and released them on his own independent label, West End Records. The album was re-released by Concord Records, and MacPherson went on to record several other releases for them. He also recorded for Sackville Records in Toronto and Justin Time Records in Montreal.

In the summer of 1993, Pacific Music Industry Association (PMIA) created the Fraser MacPherson Scholarship Fund which annually awards grants of $2000 to four to eight aspiring music students. Later that year MacPherson died in Vancouver at the age of 65.

Gallery

References

External links
Biography at vancouverjazz.com
1976 CBC interview
[ allmusic.com Entry]
1966 documentary "Diary of a Musician"

1928 births
1993 deaths
Canadian jazz saxophonists
Male saxophonists
Canadian people of Scottish descent
Concord Records artists
Juno Award for Best Jazz Album winners
Members of the Order of Canada
Musicians from Vancouver
Musicians from Victoria, British Columbia
Musicians from Winnipeg
People from Saint Boniface, Winnipeg
20th-century saxophonists
Powder Blues Band members
20th-century Canadian male musicians
Canadian male jazz musicians
Sackville Records artists
Justin Time Records artists